Inta Somethin' is a live album by American jazz trumpeter Kenny Dorham featuring performances recorded at The Jazz Workshop in San Francisco in 1961 and released on the Pacific Jazz label.

Reception

The Allmusic review awarded the album 4½ stars.

In a three star review in the May 10, 1962 issue of Down Beat magazine noted jazz critic John. S. Wilson stated: "The most interesting aspect of this disc is the assortment of views it give of McLean going through a phase in which he seems to be absorbing some John Coltrane and Eric Dolphy influences."

Track listing
All compositions by Kenny Dorham except as indicated

 "Us" - 7:15
 "It Could Happen to You" (Johnny Burke, Jimmy Van Heusen) - 6:00  
 "Let's Face the Music and Dance (Irving Berlin) - 6:06
 "No Two People" (Frank Loesser) - 6:59
 "Lover Man" (Jimmy Davis, Ram Ramirez, James Sherman) - 5:01  
 "San Francisco Beat" - 7:12

Personnel
Kenny Dorham - trumpet (except tracks 3 and 5)
Jackie McLean - alto saxophone (except track 2)
Walter Bishop Jr. - piano
Leroy Vinnegar - bass 
Art Taylor - drums

References

Pacific Jazz Records live albums
Kenny Dorham albums
1962 live albums